Dominic Rennie Raab (born 25 February 1974) is a British politician who has served as Deputy Prime Minister of the United Kingdom, Secretary of State for Justice, and Lord Chancellor since October 2022, having previously served from 2021 to September 2022. He has been Member of Parliament (MP) for Esher and Walton since 2010. A member of the Conservative Party, he served as Brexit Secretary in 2018 and as both First Secretary of State and Foreign Secretary from 2019 to 2021.

Born in Buckinghamshire, Raab attended Dr Challoner's Grammar School. He studied law at Lady Margaret Hall, Oxford, switching to Jesus College, Cambridge to study for a master's degree. He began his career as a solicitor at Linklaters, before working at the Foreign and Commonwealth Office and as a political aide. He was elected for Esher and Walton at the 2010 general election. As a backbencher, Raab co-wrote a number of papers and books, including After the Coalition (2011) and Britannia Unchained (2012). He served as Parliamentary Under-Secretary of State for Justice in the second government of David Cameron from 2015 to 2016. Following Theresa May's appointment as Prime Minister, Raab returned to the backbenches but was appointed to the second May government as Minister of State for Courts and Justice following the 2017 general election. In the 2018 cabinet reshuffle, he was moved to the post of Minister of State for Housing and Planning.

In 2018, Raab was promoted to Secretary of State for Exiting the European Union following the resignation of David Davis. Two weeks later, Raab was deputised by May to negotiate Britain's departure from the European Union, leaving him to oversee domestic preparations instead. Four months later, Raab resigned as Brexit Secretary in opposition to May's draft Brexit withdrawal agreement.

Following May's resignation in 2019, Raab ran to succeed her in the 2019 Conservative Party leadership election; he was eliminated in the second ballot of Conservative MPs. Following Boris Johnson's appointment as Prime Minister, Raab was appointed First Secretary of State and Secretary of State for Foreign and Commonwealth Affairs. In 2020, when the Department for International Development was merged with the Foreign and Commonwealth Office, Raab's post was retitled Secretary of State for Foreign, Commonwealth and Development Affairs. In the 2021 cabinet reshuffle, he was moved to the posts of Deputy Prime Minister, Secretary of State for Justice and Lord Chancellor. Following a stint on the backbenches during the premiership of Liz Truss, he was re-appointed to the posts in Rishi Sunak's ministry.

Early life and education
Dominic Rennie Raab was born on 25 February 1974 in Buckinghamshire. He is the son of Jean, a clothes buyer, and Peter Raab, a food manager for Marks & Spencer. His father, who was Jewish, came to Britain from Czechoslovakia in 1938 at age six, when his family decided to flee because the Munich Agreement gave the Sudetenland to Nazi Germany. Raab was brought up in his English mother's faith, in the Church of England. He grew up in Gerrards Cross, Buckinghamshire. Raab was 12 years old when his father died of cancer.

Raab attended Dr Challoner's Grammar School, Amersham and spent a brief period as a volunteer on Kibbutz Sarid before studying law at Lady Margaret Hall, Oxford, where he had a room on the same corridor as future Channel 4 News presenter Cathy Newman. Raab spent his time at Oxford "doing a lot of karate" and captained the university karate team, and graduated with a Bachelor of Arts degree in Jurisprudence. He then pursued further studies at Jesus College, Cambridge, where he won the Clive Parry Prize for International Law, and obtained a Master of Laws degree.

Early career

After leaving Cambridge, Raab trained professionally at the major City of London law firm Linklaters, completing his mandatory two-year training contract at the firm. Raab qualified as a solicitor in the UK under Linklaters in the year 2000, leaving the firm shortly after qualifying, also in 2000. At Linklaters, Raab worked on project finance, international litigation and competition law. This included time on secondments at Liberty (the human rights NGO) and in Brussels advising on EU and WTO law.

In total Raab worked for six years professionally as a solicitor after qualifying, in both commercial work and civil service positions for the government in the Foreign Office, before leaving the legal profession to pursue politics in 2006.

During his time as a lawyer in the Civil Service under the Labour Government until 2006, Raab's briefs included leading a team at the British Embassy in The Hague, dedicated to bringing war criminals to justice in a position closely linked to Tony Blair. After returning to London, he advised on the Arab–Israeli conflict, the European Union and Gibraltar. He defended Tony Blair against a subpoena from former Yugoslav President Slobodan Milošević.

On moving from the legal profession to politics in 2006, Raab's first political roles as part of the Conservative Party were as an aide to MP David Davis, and then to Dominic Grieve. When, most of two decades later in 2021 in his ministerial political career Raab was appointed Justice Secretary, he was described within the legal press as an "ex-rookie" solicitor of a major law firm.

Parliamentary career

Member of Parliament 
Raab was elected to Parliament at the 2010 election to represent Esher and Walton, a then safe Conservative seat in Surrey, with a total of 32,134 votes (58.9% of the vote) and a majority of 18,593 over his nearest rival.

Raab lives in and commutes from Thames Ditton, in his constituency. Since being elected he has campaigned for fairer funding for local services in Elmbridge, stronger local democracy in the running of community hospitals in Cobham, Walton and Molesey, more visible and responsive policing, and against the construction of an M25 service station at Downside.

In the House of Commons, Raab spoke in support of the coalition government's plans to cut the budget deficit, expand academy schools, repeal the Identity Cards Act 2006, and enact a Freedom Bill. He criticised the government for opting into the EU directive on the European Investigation Order, arguing it would strain operational policing resources, and would dilute safeguards protecting British citizens from misuse of personal data and guaranteeing a fair trial.

Raab came to media attention in August 2010, after requesting that the pressure group 38 Degrees remove his parliamentary email address from their website, arguing that lobby groups sending or coordinating 'clone emails' designed to deluge MPs' inboxes detracted from their ability to correspond with constituents and help those in real need. 38 Degrees said that the email address is paid for by taxpayers' money and is in the public domain, thus they have every right to host it on their website and use it for campaigning.

Raab has participated in debates on giving prisoners the vote and extradition. In April 2011, he also presented an ultimately unsuccessful Ten Minute Rule Bill proposing that emergency service and transport unions should be required by law to ensure that strike votes receive 50% support of union members. Raab argued that reform was needed to prevent "militant union bosses" holding the "hard working majority" to ransom.

On 7 March 2012, Raab opened a debate in the House of Commons on Sergei Magnitsky and Impunity for Gross Human Rights Abuses, calling on the UK government to bring forward legislative proposals that would allow it to impose visa bans and asset freezes on state officials responsible for gross human rights abuses against individuals. The motion was supported by three former Foreign Secretaries and two former Foreign Ministers and had cross-party support and was passed unanimously by MPs.

On 30 January 2014, Raab proposed an amendment to the Immigration Bill to deport all prisoners given a sentence of a year or more. It was defeated, but allowed 99 members to voice that change was necessary to prevent immigrants convicted of crimes from using the ECHR as support to remain in the UK.

In the 2015 general election on 7 May, Raab retained his Esher and Walton seat with a majority of 28,000 votes over his nearest rival. On 12 May, he was appointed Parliamentary Under-Secretary of State at the Ministry of Justice under Michael Gove, with responsibility for human rights questions. In September 2015, in this capacity, he addressed representatives of the 46 other member states of the Council of Europe on the question of the UK's blanket ban on prisoner voting.

In the 2017 general election, Raab was elected with a reduced majority of 23,000. In the 2019 general election, he was reelected with a significantly reduced majority of 2,743.

In February 2018, Raab advertised for an unpaid intern just ahead of a Department for Business, Energy and Industrial Strategy (BEIS) publication responding to the Taylor review on insecure work. The BEIS report criticised "exploitative unpaid internships", saying "an employer cannot avoid paying someone the minimum wage simply by calling them an 'intern' or saying that they are doing an internship."

In the 2018 cabinet reshuffle Raab was appointed Minister of State for Housing and Planning.

Libel case
On 30 January 2011, The Mail on Sunday published an article alleging – falsely – that Raab, in his previous role as Chief of Staff to David Davis in 2007, had paid a female employee £20,000 in an out-of-court settlement as part of a confidentiality agreement to drop a claim of workplace bullying. Raab responded by stating: "This is a smear and any insinuation that I have behaved improperly is false and malicious". He subsequently sued the newspaper for libel. The Mail on Sundays publisher Associated Newspapers' attempt to stop the action was denied by the High Court in December 2011.

During these proceedings, it was disclosed that the employee had taken a claim against Raab to an employment tribunal, where it was settled with a compromise agreement which included monetary compensation and a confidentiality clause for both parties. The newspaper issued an apology on 18 March 2012, stating: "We accept that our allegations were unfounded and we apologise to Mr Raab for the damage, embarrassment and offence caused".

Westminster dossier

In late October 2017, a dossier listing allegations of a mainly sexual nature against several dozen Conservative MPs made internally by party researchers was circulated at Westminster and amongst journalists. Raab wrote on his website at the beginning of November that his entry made a false accusation of an "Injunction for inappropriate behaviour with a woman". He commented: "I have never been served with any injunction for anything. Nor have I ever sought one". It was "false and malicious" to make "any insinuation that I have engaged in anything resembling sexual harassment, sexually abusive behaviour or lewd remarks". He believed the dossier itself was a "form of harassment and intimidation". Raab said he was taking legal advice.

Impact of immigration on the housing market 
In April 2018, as Minister of State for Housing and Planning Raab said in an interview that immigration had "put house prices up by something like 20%" over the past 25 years. The UK Statistics Authority asked Raab to publish the evidence for his claim. A document published by the Ministry of Housing, Communities and Local Government shows that the finding was based on an out-of-date model that had never been intended for this kind of analysis. Raab defended the model and said: "I did indeed say care was needed with the data, and I was right that immigration put average prices up by 20%. We need a balanced approach."

EU referendum campaign
Raab was an active campaigner in the 2016 EU membership referendum, advocating that Britain should leave the European Union. He said in an interview that it would be better for the British economy to leave: "We'll be better off if we're freed up to trade more energetically with the growth markets like Latin America and Asia. I think it will be good for job creation and also cut prices in the stores." He also argued that there was too much waste and corruption in the EU. During the Brexit campaign, Raab repeatedly argued that there was no doubt that the UK would get a trade deal with the EU.

Brexit Secretary

On 9 July 2018, following the resignation of David Davis, Raab was appointed Secretary of State for Exiting the European Union, and was later deputised by Theresa May after just two weeks to oversee domestic preparations while May would be in charge of actually meeting with EU Officials.

In November 2018, Raab was criticised by Labour's shadow Brexit minister, Jenny Chapman, after Raab said that he "hadn't quite understood the full extent" of how much UK trade relies on the Dover–Calais crossing.

On 15 November 2018, Raab announced his resignation as Brexit Secretary, citing his disapproval over the Cabinet position on the draft Brexit withdrawal agreement. According to a BBC News report, Raab was concerned with "two major and fatal flaws" in the draft agreement, namely that the proposed terms "threaten the integrity of the United Kingdom" and that "they would lead to an indefinite if not permanent situation where [the UK is] locked into a regime with no say over the rules being applied, with no exit mechanism", flaws which would prove "damaging for the economy but devastating for public trust in our democracy". While subsequently describing May's deal as worse than remaining in the EU, he voted in favour of it at the occasion of the third vote on the withdrawal agreement on 29 March 2019. He described the Irish backstop as "undemocratic and [...] something that will have to be removed."

Following his resignation, Raab defended the position that the UK should not pay the so-called Brexit divorce bill (amounting to around £39 billion) in the event of a no-deal Brexit. This bill reflects commitments which the UK entered into for the EU's Multiannual Financial Framework for the years 2014–2020 and so according to some interpretations is not linked to Britain's exit from the European Union. The House of Lords alternatively found that the UK would not be liable for such payments.

In June 2019, unnamed EU sources claimed that Raab had been nicknamed "The Turnip" in Brussels, a play on raap, the Dutch word for the vegetable, suggesting EU dissatisfaction with his negotiation strategy.

2019 Conservative Party leadership election 
On 25 May 2019, Raab announced he was standing in the Conservative Party leadership election after Theresa May announced her resignation. In the second round of voting, on 18 June, Raab failed to obtain the required minimum number of 33 votes, winning 30 and finishing in sixth place, behind Sajid Javid. After being eliminated, he endorsed the frontrunner Boris Johnson, who subsequently won the contest.

First Secretary of State and Foreign Secretary 

On 24 July 2019, Boris Johnson appointed Raab Foreign Secretary, succeeding Jeremy Hunt, and handed him the additional title First Secretary of State. On arrival at the Foreign Office, Raab said: "I'm hugely humbled to take on this role at this time and excited about the opportunities that lie ahead."

In 2019, the International Court of Justice in The Hague ruled that the United Kingdom must transfer the Chagos Archipelago to Mauritius as they were not legally separated from the latter in 1965. In its statement rejecting the ruling, the Foreign Office said: "The United Kingdom has no doubt about its sovereignty over the Chagos Archipelago, which has been under continuous British sovereignty since 1814." The shadow foreign secretary, Lisa Nandy, in a letter to Raab said the UK position "is damaging to Britain's reputation, undermines your credibility and moral authority".

Raab stood in for Johnson at Prime Minister's Questions on 2 October 2019, as First Secretary of State.

On 3 January 2020, the high-level Iranian General Qasem Soleimani was assassinated by the United States, which considerably heightened the existing tensions between the two countries. Raab backed the strike, describing the American action as self-defence. He said that his government had "always recognised the aggressive threat posed by the Iranian Quds force".

Raab supported Johnson's decision to allow China's Huawei to build part of UK's 5G network despite U.S. and Australian opposition.

On 23 March, during the coronavirus pandemic, the government confirmed that Raab, as First Secretary of State, was to deputise for Johnson if he became "incapacitated" due to COVID-19. On 6 April, after Johnson was admitted to an intensive care unit due to his illness with COVID-19, Raab was asked to deputise for Johnson. In April 2020, Raab was questioned in the first two sessions of virtual Prime Minister's Questions (PMQs) by new Labour Leader Keir Starmer.

In April 2020, Raab warned that the UK cannot go back to "business as usual" with China after the end of the COVID-19 pandemic.

On 16 June, it was announced by the Prime Minister that Raab would absorb the responsibilities of the Secretary of State for International Development in September 2020 upon the formation of a joint department called the Foreign, Commonwealth and Development Office. His brief changed to Secretary of State for Foreign, Commonwealth and Development Affairs on 2 September, and he said that the UK would continue to spend 0.7% of its national income on foreign aid.

After the 30 June 2020 imposition by the Xi Jinping regime of the national security law in Hong Kong, Raab described the following day in the Commons what he saw as a "grave and deeply disturbing" event, dissected the affront to the Sino-British Joint Declaration in the Commons, and announced a new chapter in Hong Kong–United Kingdom relations with substantial changes to the idea of British National (Overseas) permits. Raab did not rule out boycotting the 2022 Winter Olympics over the treatment of the Uyghur Muslims by the Chinese government.

Raab welcomed the peace agreement between Israel and the United Arab Emirates, saying he was gladdened by suspension of Israel's plans to annex parts of the occupied Palestinian territories in the West Bank. Raab also welcomed the normalization of relations between Israel and Sudan, saying that it is "a positive step between two valued friends."

In March 2020, Raab visited the mausoleum of the Turkish leader Mustafa Kemal Atatürk and called Turkey a "staunch ally in NATO and one of its largest contributors of military personnel." Raab said, "The UK stands with Turkey in the fight against terrorism, and recognises the serious threat posed" by the Kurdish separatist movement PKK. On 6 October, Raab warned that the result of the 2020 Nagorno-Karabakh conflict between Armenia and Azerbaijan may be the strengthening of relations between Russia and Turkey, saying that a "battle for geopolitical stances is in progress. I believe that even though the behavior of our Turkish partners in NATO is sometimes disappointing, we need to be very careful with the risk that Turkey is falling into Russia's arms."

On 10 May 2021, Raab condemned rocket attacks on Israel and called for "immediate de-escalation on all sides" and an "end to targeting of civilian populations".

On 15 August 2021, as the Taliban militant group once again controlled a vast majority of Afghan territory, the Taliban began capturing the capital city of Kabul. Raab was abroad on holiday when Kabul fell to the Taliban. He returned to the UK on 16 August and said the UK government was surprised by the "scale and pace" of the Taliban's takeover of Afghanistan.  Defence secretary Ben Wallace admitted all remaining UK nationals and Afghan allies might not get away and said "Some people won't get back". Unnamed sources told The Guardian Raab refused to talk to some Foreign Office staff and this allegedly caused problems during the Afghanistan evacuation. Raab denies the claims. The Foreign Affairs Select Committee said the government was "missing in action" after examining the episode. Unnamed insiders told The Guardian in November 2022 that Raab limited the number of senior staff he dealt with. Unnamed sources said "Decisions that should have taken hours took days or simply did not happen." Raab allegedly avoided communicating with "those he found to be challenging voices".

Deputy Prime Minister and Justice Secretary

First term (2021–2022)
In a cabinet reshuffle on 15 September 2021, Raab was appointed Secretary of State for Justice and Lord Chancellor. He was also given the title of Deputy Prime Minister, a post unused since the Cameron–Clegg coalition.

Raab declined to run in the July–September 2022 Conservative Party leadership election. He endorsed Rishi Sunak's leadership bid.

In August 2022, Raab moved to block the release of the parents of now seven-year-old Tony Hudgell, who had been abused by them and had to have his legs amputated.

The Guardian reported in December 2022 that Raab prevented the victims' commissioner for England and Wales being reappointed and is not expected to replace her for months. According to victims' groups, critical legislation was going through parliament without an independent reviewer. Unnamed sources stated Raab intervened to stop Vera Baird staying as victims' commissioner.

Second term (2022–present)

Raab was reappointed by Rishi Sunak as Deputy Prime Minister, Justice Secretary and Lord Chancellor on 25 October 2022. In November 2022, Raab said that terrorist offenders would face longer sentences if they committed crime, such as vandalising cells, while in prison.

Behaviour complaints
On 16 November 2022, two formal complaints were made about Raab's behaviour during his time as Justice Secretary and Foreign Secretary in Boris Johnson's government. Allegations against Raab included that he lost his temper during work and that staff were "scared" to enter his office. After Raab had been notified about the two formal complaints, Rishi Sunak agreed to Raab's request for an independent inquiry into the complaints. Raab said he would "co-operate fully" and that he would "thoroughly rebut and refute" the claims against him. He said he had "never tolerated bullying" and was confident that he had behaved professionally. Adam Tolley KC was appointed to undertake the investigation. "The prime minister will remain the arbiter of the code," the PM's official spokesman stated.  

The Observer was told in November 2022 there were concerns about the way Raab treated officials while he was Brexit secretary in 2018. An unnamed senior source said that a prominent official in the Brexit department sent a document stating a "formal expression of concern" to the Cabinet Office. The Observer understands the document claimed "unprofessional, even bullying, conduct of the minister towards his private office". A source who knew the complaint said that no action was taken. Sources close to Raab denied the complaint. A formal investigation will include looking at what Raab did in 2018 as Brexit secretary.

The Guardian reported in November 2022 that unnamed Ministry of Justice sources said that senior civil servants who directly experienced Raab's alleged aggressive behaviour and bullying had made "a handful" of formal complaints. An unnamed MoJ insider told The Guardian that the new allegations were "more serious and more specific" than previous claims over Raab's abrasive management style. Raab was allegedly "demeaning and aggressive" to staff. Unnamed Whitehall sources earlier complained Raab had behaved "so badly and inappropriately" at an earlier high-level meeting that Antonia Romeo had to contact senior officials of the home secretary to express regret.

Simon McDonald said in November 2022 that staff were "scared to go into his [Raab's] office" due to his "controlling" manner. McDonald, who was with Raab at the Foreign Office said: "It was language, it was tone, he would be very curt with people. And he did this in front of a lot of other people." McDonald said that people felt demeaned, that Raab "was not aware of the impact of his behaviour (...) and couldn't be made to see that impact." A spokesman for Raab denied the allegations. Helen Grant, who worked with Raab as a minister at the Foreign Office, said Raab had been "very decent", with "high professional standards".

In November 2022 it was reported in The Guardian that senior civil servants in the Ministry of Justice were offered "respite or a route out" of the department after Raab was reappointed due to fears that some were traumatised by his behaviour when he was there before. Antonia Romeo allegedly spoke to Raab to warn him to treat staff professionally and with respect. Multiple unnamed sources within the Ministry of Justice told The Guardian that Raab created a "culture of fear" in the department. The unnamed sources said that Raab was "demeaning rather than demanding", was "very rude and aggressive" and "wasn't just unprofessional, he was a bully". Raab's spokesman said he "holds himself to the highest standards of professionalism". The Sun suggested Raab had once hurled tomatoes from a salad across a room in a fit of anger. Raab's spokesman said the claim was "nonsense".

The Times reported a formal complaint that civil servants were "signed off work for extended periods of time" when Raab was Justice secretary. Some civil servants were allegedly left in tears after speaking to Raab or his senior team according to The Times. The newspaper further suggested that work pressure and unreasonable deadlines impacted some colleagues' mental and physical health to the point where they saw their GPs. A group of mid-ranking officials reportedly submitted the complaint against Raab in March 2022. The report was allegedly resubmitted in the week to 17 November 2022 after the government stated that no formal complaints had been made against Raab. It was further reported that the complaint also alleged that a "tangible shift towards a dysfunctional working culture is starting to hinder" effective work in the department.

On 24 November 2022 The Guardian reported that BBC Newsnight alleged that some of Raab's unnamed former private secretaries were preparing formal complaints. Dave Penman  of the civil service’s FDA alleged there were many allegations apparently from various departments where Raab had worked. Penman wants Sunak to approve investigating every complaint.  When asked by Newsnight whether the complaints could appear like a "witch-hunt", Penman said it "demonstrated a level of concern about the deputy prime minister's behaviour." Penman added that the large number of complaints about a minister's behaviour was unprecedented. Penman alleged Sunak must decide if it is "safe" for civil servants to work with Raab despite serious allegations about his behaviour. Raab has previously denied any wrongdoing and expressed support for the review.  Labour wants Sunak to enlarge the inquiry and enable the independent investigation of formal and informal complaints. On 14 December 2022, Sunak's spokesman said that five more complaints over Raab's alleged behaviour as justice secretary were being investigated. It was reported in January 2023 that unnamed Conservative MPs and former ministers want Raab to resign.

Political positions

Human Rights Act 
In 2009, prior to becoming an MP, Raab said he did not support the Human Rights Act, stating that "The very enactment of the Human Rights Act has served as a trigger for the formulation of claims by lawyers and judicial reasoning by courts, using human rights arguments that would never have been dared before. The spread of rights has become contagious and, since the Human Rights Act, opened the door to vast new categories of claims, which can be judicially enforced against the government through the courts."

Positive discrimination 
In July 2010, he secured a review of positive discrimination rules being applied to Foreign and Commonwealth Office work experience schemes, having been contacted by a constituent who had been rejected from the scheme for failing to meet "the social criteria". The two programmes at the organisation barred white males from applying, other than those from low-income backgrounds; Raab argued they re-introduced discrimination 'via the backdoor'. The MP welcomed the review, blaming the situation on the previous Labour government. He stated "positive discrimination is wrong in the same way as negative discrimination. It means people are thinking in terms of social criteria and it is anti-meritocratic."

Palestinian state 
In August 2020, Raab visited Israel and the West Bank to "press for renewed dialogue" between the two sides.

In 2011, Raab wrote that "Peace must precede Palestinian statehood", and criticised the Israeli settlements as undermining "the prospects for a continuous Palestinian state."

Prisoners' rights 
On 10 February 2011, Raab gave the winding-up speech in the debate on whether to give prisoners the vote, arguing that freedom entails responsibility and that elected lawmakers in the House of Commons rather than "unaccountable" judges in Strasbourg should decide the matter.

On 22 June 2011, the Joint Committee on Human Rights (JCHR) published a report on The Human Rights Implications of British extradition. As a member of the JCHR, Raab proposed that the committee look into the issue of fast-track extradition of British citizens following several instances of miscarriages of justice. In an article for The Times, Raab argued that more needed to be done to protect British citizens subject to European Arrest Warrants. The JCHR has called for safeguards to ensure warrants are not issued for minor offences and when there is minimal evidence, and for checks to prevent extradition for investigation rather than prosecution. On 24 November 2011, Raab led a debate in the House of Commons calling for extradition reform. His motion had cross-party support, and was backed by Gary McKinnon's mother, Janis Sharpe.

The Miller case
On 3 November 2016, and in response to the decision of the High Court in R (Miller) v Secretary of State for Exiting the European Union on whether the government was entitled to notify an intention to leave the European Union under Article 50 of the Treaty on European Union without a vote in Parliament, Raab stated that in the 2016 EU membership referendum "the British people gave a clear mandate for the UK Government to leave the EU and take back control of our borders, laws, money and trade. It is disappointing that today the court has chosen to ignore their decision". He went on to state that the decision was "a plain attempt to block Brexit by people who are out of touch with the country and refuse to accept the result. However, the vote to leave the EU was clear and they should not seek to obstruct it".

Saudi Arabia
In October 2018, Raab told BBC One's The Andrew Marr Show that the assassination of Jamal Khashoggi was a "terrible case" but the UK government was "not throwing our hands in the air and terminating the relationship with Saudi Arabia, not just because of the huge number of British jobs that depend on it but also because if you exert influence over your partners you need to be able to talk to them... The problem with Labour's position is it would cost thousands of British jobs."

Writings

Civil liberties and justice
In 2009, Raab published his first book, The Assault on Liberty – What Went Wrong with Rights. In October 2010, he published Fight Terror, Defend Freedom, a pamphlet on the Home Office counter-terrorism review.

In January 2011, Raab wrote an article on the use of control orders in counter-terrorism cases in which he contended that they are ineffective and should be scrapped with a greater focus on prosecutions.

In April 2011 Raab published a pamphlet with the think tank Civitas entitled Strasbourg in the Dock. The pamphlet followed Parliament's recent rejection of a European Court of Human Rights ruling (the Hirst case) that at least some prisoners should have the right to vote. Raab argued that judges had overstepped the mark in relation to the case because they were not elected. The Strasbourg judges are elected by the 324 members of the
Parliamentary Assembly of the Council of Europe; members are drawn from the national parliaments of the Council of Europe's member states. Raab contended that many of the judges were lacking experience and as a result "are undermining the credibility and value of the Court". Raab made a range of proposals to strengthen the authority of Britain's Supreme Court, give elected lawmakers the last word on the creation of new rights, and reform the Strasbourg Court.

In July 2011, Raab called for reform of the UK Borders Act 2007, which allows foreign criminals to avoid deportation by claiming a "right to family life" under Article 8 of the European Convention on Human Rights. He proposed that the reference to the Human Rights Act be removed. He argued this could be done in a way that ensures foreign criminals could avoid deportation only if there is a "serious risk" they will be tortured on their return.

Equality, meritocracy, and positive discrimination
On 30 January 2011, he wrote a comment piece for The Sunday Times on implementation of the Equality Act 2010. Raab argued for a meritocratic approach against positive discrimination and highlighted the lower standard of human rights protections in extradition cases compared with deportation cases.

In an article in January 2011 on the Politics Home website, Raab argued in favour of transferable paternity leave and against "the equality bandwagon ... pitting men and women against each other". He argued in favour of a consistent approach to sexism against men and women commenting that some feminists were "now amongst the most obnoxious bigots" and it was sexist to blame men for the recession.

Raab highlighted the wide range of sex discrimination he said was faced by males including "anti-male discrimination in rights of maternity/paternity leave", young boys being "educationally disadvantaged compared to girls", and how "divorced or separated fathers are systematically ignored by the courts". Raab stated "from the cradle to the grave, men are getting a raw deal. Men work longer hours, die earlier, but retire later than women", noting that the pensions inequalities were still not going to be rectified for another seven years.

He was subsequently interviewed on the piece by the London Evening Standard, as well as BBC Radio 4. Theresa May, who was Minister for Women and Equalities at the time, criticised Raab's "obnoxious bigots" comment but agreed with his suggestions on paternity leave and ending gender warfare. Her remarks took place during a debate on employment law in the House of Commons.

Raab's remarks were criticised by some Labour MPs, including Harriet Harman and Nia Griffith, who said Raab should "stop being so self-pitying. The reality is that women with very good qualifications time and time again do not get the top jobs and opportunities." Raab stood by his comments in a comment piece for The Daily Telegraph, highlighting the various statements Harman had made about men, contrasting them with similar comments about women by the likes of Andy Gray. Raab also stated he had received an "overwhelmingly positive" reaction to his comments "from both men and women".

In July 2012, Raab published a pamphlet with the Centre for Policy Studies entitled Unleashing the British Underdog: 10 Bets on the Little Guy. In the report, Raab outlines 10 policies to improve social mobility and provide opportunities for those from non-traditional backgrounds to succeed.

After the Coalition
In October 2011, Dominic Raab and four other MPs of the 2010 intake published After the Coalition, an argument that Conservative principles adapted to the modern world would be essential for the future national success of the party. The book was serialised in The Daily Telegraph. Raab wrote his piece for the paper on British foreign policy, arguing it should reflect the national interest: Britain should not overextend itself in foreign conflicts, aid should be focused on the poorest countries and Britain should champion free trade abroad.

Regulation 
In November 2011, Raab wrote a pamphlet published by the Centre for Policy Studies, Escaping the Strait Jacket – Ten Regulatory Reforms to Create Jobs. The paper makes the case for reforming red tape to boost job creation on grounds of economic competitiveness and social fairness.

Britannia Unchained

In September 2012 Raab co-authored the book Britannia Unchained. The book addressed issues of the national debt, state education, innovation and work ethic.

Raab called for measures to cut regulation on start-up companies, expand vocational training, reduce childcare costs and lower marginal (income-focused) rates of taxation to "rediscover and reward the lost virtue of hard-work – a tried and tested route to individual success, a more prosperous economy and a fairer society."

Writing on work ethic in The Daily Telegraph, Raab said that longer periods in education, earlier retirement, welfare dependency and high marginal rates of taxation had led to a situation where "(w)e have a smaller proportion of the workforce pedalling harder to sustain the rest – which is economically debilitating and socially divisive."

Personal life
Raab is married to Erika Rey, a Brazilian marketing executive who until 2020 worked for Google. They have two children, and live in Thames Ditton, Surrey.

Raab holds a black belt, third dan in karate.

In October 2021, following the murder of Sir David Amess, Raab told ITV News that he had received three death threats in the previous two years.

Awards 
Raab won Newcomer of the Year for 2011 at The Spectator magazine's Parliamentary Awards.

In 2019, LBC's Iain Dale and a panel placed Raab fourth in a list of that year's "Top 100 Most Influential Conservatives".

Notes

References

External links

Raab's blog
Raab's channel at YouTube

|-

|-

|-

|-

|-

|-

|-

|-

1974 births
Living people
Alumni of Jesus College, Cambridge
Alumni of Lady Margaret Hall, Oxford
British male karateka
Conservative Party (UK) MPs for English constituencies
21st-century English lawyers
English people of Czech-Jewish descent
English male karateka
Male critics of feminism
People educated at Dr Challoner's Grammar School
People from Buckinghamshire
People from Thames Ditton
British people of Czech-Jewish descent
Secretaries of State for Exiting the European Union
British Secretaries of State for Foreign and Commonwealth Affairs
First Secretaries of State of the United Kingdom
Deputy Prime Ministers of the United Kingdom
Secretaries of State for Justice (UK)
Lord chancellors of Great Britain
Ministers of State for Housing (UK)
UK MPs 2010–2015
UK MPs 2015–2017
UK MPs 2017–2019
UK MPs 2019–present
Free Enterprise Group